Modern Gallery may refer to:

 The Modern Gallery, the 1915-1919 name of the Marius de Zayas gallery on the New York 5th Ave
 Modern Gallery, Zagreb
 Modern Gallery of the Saarland Museum
 Tate Modern gallery
 Pinakothek der Moderne

See also
 Gallery of Modern Art